Sonate di Scarlatti, originally titled Tivoli, Giardino di Scarlatti, is a ballet made by New York City Ballet ballet master in chief Peter Martins to Domenico Scarlatti's Sonatas Nos. 164, 424. 188, 335, 104, 483, 349, 3, 23, 209, 465 (1728–1757). The premiere took place on 13 July 1979 at the Saratoga Performing Arts Center, Saratoga Springs, NY.

Original cast 

Heather Watts
Bart Cook
Elyse Borne
Judith Fugate
Lisa Hess
Lourdes Lopez
Victor Castelli
Peter Frame
Douglas Hay
Kipling Houston

Ballets by Peter Martins
Ballets to the music of Domenico Scarlatti
1979 ballet premieres
New York City Ballet repertory